Thelma Cabras Maloloy-on (February 27, 1964 – February 10, 1984), better known by her stage name Claudia Zobel, was a Filipino actress.

Maloloy-on was killed in a car accident on February 10, 1984, in Makati, Philippines, seventeen days short of her 20th birthday. On August 27, 2013, 29 years after her death, Zobel's body, was exhumed to be relocated beside her father's remains. However, upon opening the casket, relatives found her body to be in a perfect mummified state, with details on her skin still clearly visible.

Filmography

Movies

References

External links

1964 births
1984 deaths
Actresses from Cebu
Filipino child actresses
Filipino film actresses
Road incident deaths in the Philippines